Jack McAuliffe may refer to:

Jack McAuliffe (American football) (1901–1971), American football player
Jack McAuliffe (boxer) (1866–1937), Irish-born American boxer
Jack McAuliffe (brewer) (born 1945), American microbrewer

See also
 John McAuliffe (1886-1959), American missionary of the Brothers of the Sacred Heart
 John B. McAuliffe, American football player and coach